Selden Palmer Spencer (September 16, 1862May 16, 1925) was an American lawyer and politician. A Republican, he was a United States Senator from Missouri.

Early life
Selden Spencer was born in Erie, Pennsylvania, to Samuel Selden and Eliza Deborah (Palmer) Spenser. He  received his basic education in Erie before attending Hopkins School, a college preparatory school in New Haven, Connecticut. Afterward Spencer attended Yale College, where he was an editor of the student newspaper and participated in Lacrosse. He graduated in 1884 with honors, seventh in a class of one hundred fifty. He then moved to St. Louis, Missouri to attend Washington University School of Law graduating in 1886.

Admitted to the bar in 1886, Spencer opened a law practice in St. Louis with future Missouri governor Forrest Donnell while also serving as a professor of medical jurisprudence at the Missouri Medical College. The college later honored him with an honorary M.D. degree in appreciation of his efforts. Westminster College in Fulton, Missouri also granted him honorary Ph.D and LL.D degrees.

Politics

Selden Spencer first held elected office in 1895 when he was voted a member of the Missouri House of Representatives. While in the Missouri House he was Chairman of the Committee on Banks and Banking, as well as on the Judiciary, Ways and Means, Militia, and Rules Committees. From 1897 to 1903 he was a judge of the United States circuit court. At the end of his term on the court Spencer returned to his law practice. He also became heavily involved with the American Bar Association, serving on its executive board and as vice-president in 1914. 
Spencer was a member of the Missouri State Militia, attaining the rank of captain. During World War I he was chairman of a St. Louis area draft board.

The unexpected death of Missouri U.S. Senator William J. Stone in April, 1918 prompted Selden Spencer's return to political office. Xenophon P. Wilfley was appointed a temporary replacement until a special election could be held. In November, 1918  Spencer defeated former Governor Joseph W. Folk with 52-percent of the vote to fill the remaining two years of Stone's term. In 1920 Selden Spencer won reelection, first by defeating tennis star-turned-politician Dwight F. Davis in the Republican primary, then Democrat Breckinridge Long by over 121,000 votes in the November general election.

While in the Senate, he was chairman of the Committee on Claims (Sixty-sixth and Sixty-seventh Congresses) and a member of the Committee on Indian Affairs (Sixty-seventh Congress) and the Committee on Privileges and Elections (Sixty-seventh through Sixty-ninth Congresses). Senator Spencer was also noted for being one of the Republicans in opposition to the Treaty of Versailles and America's participation in the League of Nations, working with Senator Henry Cabot Lodge and the Irreconcilables. Senator Spencer made numerous speeches against the treaty while campaigning for fellow Republicans in 1920 and 1922. Senator Selden P. Spencer died at Walter Reed Hospital in Washington, D.C. on May 16, 1925 following complications from hernia surgery. He is buried in Bellefontaine Cemetery in St. Louis.

See also
List of United States Congress members who died in office (1900–49)

References

External links
 

1862 births
1925 deaths
Politicians from Erie, Pennsylvania
Hopkins School alumni
Yale College alumni
Washington University School of Law alumni
Politicians from St. Louis
Missouri lawyers
Republican Party members of the Missouri House of Representatives
Missouri state court judges
Republican Party United States senators from Missouri
Lawyers from St. Louis